Nate or NATE may refer to:

People and fictional characters
Nate (given name)
A nickname for Nathanael
A nickname for Nathaniel

Organizations
National Association for the Teaching of English, the UK subject teacher association for all aspects of English from pre-school to university
National Association of Theatrical Television and Kine Employees, formerly the National Association of Theatrical Employees

Other uses
Nakajima Ki-27, Japanese aircraft of World War II, called "Nate"
Tropical Storm Nate (disambiguation)
Nate (web portal),  South Korean web portal
Nate Station, a train station in Kinokawa, Wakayama Prefecture, Japan
Nate, a 2006 novel by Phil Henderson
Nate – A One Man Show, a performance by Natalie Palamides

See also

Nat (disambiguation)